The 2011–12 Tennessee Tech Golden Eagles men's basketball team represented Tennessee Technological University during the 2011–12 NCAA Division I men's basketball season. The Golden Eagles, led by first year head coach Steve Payne, played their home games at the Eblen Center and are members of the Ohio Valley Conference. They finished the season 19–14, 9–7 in OVC play to finish in third place. They lost in the semifinals of the Ohio Valley Basketball tournament to Murray State. They were invited to the 2012 CollegeInsider.com Tournament where the lost in the first round to Georgia State.

Roster

Schedule

|-
!colspan=9| Regular season

|-
!colspan=9| 2012 OVC Basketball tournament

|-
!colspan=9| 2012 CIT

References

Tennessee Tech Golden Eagles men's basketball seasons
Tennessee Tech
Tennessee Tech
Tennessee Tech Golden Eagles men's basketball
Tennessee Tech Golden Eagles men's basketball